Mieczysław Józef Golba (born 24 April 1966 in Jarosław) is a Polish politician. He was elected to the Sejm on 25 September 2005, getting 5551 votes in 22 Krosno district as a candidate from the Law and Justice list.

On 4 November 2011 he, along with 15 other supporters of the dismissed PiS MEP Zbigniew Ziobro, left Law and Justice on ideological grounds to form a breakaway group, United Poland.

See also
Members of Polish Sejm 2005-2007

References

External links
Mieczysław Golba - parliamentary page - includes declarations of interest, voting record, and transcripts of speeches.

1966 births
Living people
People from Jarosław
Members of the Polish Sejm 2005–2007
Law and Justice politicians
United Poland politicians
Members of the Polish Sejm 2007–2011
Members of the Polish Sejm 2011–2015
Members of the Senate of Poland 2015–2019
Members of the Senate of Poland 2019–2023